Placia or Plakia or Placie or Plakie, also known as Placa or Plaka or Place or Plake (Πλάκη), was a town of ancient Mysia, on the coast of the Propontis, at the foot of the Mysian Olympus east of Cyzicus. It was a Pelasgian town; in this place and the neighbouring Scylace, the Pelasgians, according to Herodotus, had preserved their ancient language down to his time. The town is mentioned in the Periplus of Pseudo-Scylax, and by Pomponius Mela, Dionysius of Halicarnassus and Pliny the Elder. 

Its site is tentatively located near Kurşunlu, in Bursa Province, Turkey.

References

Populated places in ancient Mysia
Former populated places in Turkey
Greek colonies in Mysia
History of Bursa Province